Todd Graves may refer to:

Todd Graves (attorney), American attorney 
Todd Graves (entrepreneur) (born 1972), American entrepreneur
James "Todd" Graves (born 1963), American sport shooter